Perry Township is an inactive township in St. Francois County, in the U.S. state of Missouri.

Perry Township was erected in 1821, taking its name from Oliver Hazard Perry (1785–1819), American naval officer.

References

Townships in Missouri
Townships in St. Francois County, Missouri